The Kerala Film Critics Association Award for Best Cinematographer is one of the annual awards given at the Kerala Film Critics Association Awards, honouring the best in Malayalam cinema.

Winners

References

Cinematographer
Awards for best cinematography